The film El cimarrón follows the lives of two African slaves brought to Puerto Rico during the era of slavery in the 19th Century. It is based on the life of Marcos Xiorro who conspired and planned a slave revolt in 1821.

Plot summary

Cast
 Pedro Telemaco - Marcos Xiorro
 Fernando Allende - Don Pablo
 Dolores Pedro Torriente - Carolina
 Teófilo Torres
 Mara Croatto - Elsa
 Gerardo Ortíz - Don Domingo
 Modesto Lacén - Jacinto
 Herman O'Neill - Military chief
 Daniela Droz - Clara
 Walter Rodríguez - Mayor
 Julio Axel Landrón - Sijo
 Julio Torresoto
 Eugenio Monclóva
 Idenisse Salamán - Isabel
 Guillermo de Cun
 Nestor Rodulfo

Awards
 Academy Awards: The film was considered for the 80th Academy Awards with four other Puerto Rican films. In a vote on September 24, 2007, among members of the Puerto Rico Film Corporation, Maldeamores was selected.
 Tulipanes Latino Art & Film Festival: Best of Show (2007)

See also
 Cinema of Puerto Rico
 List of films set in Puerto Rico
 List of films featuring slavery

References

External links
 
 
 Official website

2007 films
Puerto Rican films
2000s Spanish-language films
2007 drama films
Films about slavery
Films set in Puerto Rico
Films set in the 19th century